The European Space Agency (ESA) was founded in 1975 when the European Space Research Organisation (ESRO) merged with the European Launcher Development Organisation (ELDO). The ESA Convention was signed by the ESRO and ELDO members on 30 May 1975 and by Ireland on 31 December 1975. Canada signed a Cooperation Agreement on 9 December 1978. The Convention entered into force on 30 October 1980 after the ratification procedures in the 10 ESRO/ELDO members were finalised.

Current membership 
The current membership of the European Space Agency includes 22 member states, four associate members and one cooperating state:

Associate members 

The ESA Convention does not require acquisition of the status of an associate member in order for a state to become a full member. The association status is envisaged to allow associate member states to take part in ESA's deliberative bodies and decision-making and also in ESA's programmes and activities. Associate member state firms can bid for and receive contracts to work on programmes. The accord has a provision ensuring a fair industrial return to the associate members.

Previously, associate members were Austria, Norway and Finland (through its Ministry of Trade and Industry), all of which later joined ESA as full members. Portugal, Greece and Luxembourg skipped associate membership and moved from Cooperation Agreements to full ESA membership. The Czech Republic also skipped associate membership, but it went through the new enlargement process via Cooperation Agreement, ECS Agreement and PECS Charter implementation.

Currently there are four associate members: Latvia, Lithuania and Slovakia and Slovenia.

Despite that the provisions in the ESA Convention do not show restrictions that only European states can join, the ESA Council implements such rule de facto and that is why Canada has only the status of a cooperating state. However, it is as tightly integrated with the ESA institutions as possible for a non-member state.

The ELDO associate member Australia (CSIRO) decided not to continue as an associate member of ESA. Nevertheless, on 5 March 2003 the first of ESA's deep space ground stations in the world opened in Western Australia in an inauguration ceremony.

Enlargement

After the decision of the ESA Council of 21/22 March 2001 the procedure for accession of the European states was detailed as described here.
Nations who want to become a full member of ESA do so in 3 stages. First a Cooperation Agreement is signed between the country and ESA. In this stage the country has very limited financial responsibilities. If a country wants to cooperate more fully with ESA it signs a European Cooperating State (ECS) agreement.

The ECS Agreement makes companies based in the country eligible for participation in ESA procurements. The country can also participate in all ESA programmes, except for the Basic Technology Research Programme. While the financial contribution of the country concerned increases, it is still much lower than that of a full member state. The agreement is normally followed by a Plan for European Cooperating State (or PECS Charter).

This is a 5-year program of basic research and development activities aimed at improving the nations' space industry capacity. At the end of the 5-year period, the country can either begin negotiations to become a full member state or an associated state or sign a new PECS Charter. ESA is likely to expand quite rapidly in the coming years. Many countries, most of which joined the EU in both 2004 and 2007, have started to cooperate with ESA on various levels.

Listed below is the progress of all the states that have taken or are taking part in the enlargement process:

Possible future cooperation
The political perspective of the European Union (EU) had been to make ESA an agency of the EU by 2014, however, this date was not met. The EU is already the largest single donor to ESA's budget and non-ESA EU states are observers at ESA.

Three non-EU nations — Israel, Turkey and Ukraine — have cooperation agreements with ESA. Agency officials consider the prospects of full membership for these three countries as remote at the current time.

However, ESA ministers instructed agency officials to begin discussions with Australia, Israel and South Africa on future association agreements with ESA. The ministers noted that “concrete cooperation is at an advanced stage” with these nations and that “prospects for mutual benefits are existing”.

Besides EU countries, the EFTA members Norway and Switzerland are also members of ESA. Neither the remaining EFTA member states of Iceland and Liechtenstein nor the EU candidates not listed above have publicly expressed their intention to participate in the European Space Agency's activities.

In 2016, certain ESA programs were extended to Eastern Partnership member states. Armenia, Georgia and Moldova joined the ESA's Earth Observation for Eastern Partnership initiative. This move brought new perspectives to develop cooperation between the ESA and Eastern European countries. The project aims to achieve an increase in the uptake of satellite-based environmental information, while promoting regional cooperation and knowledge exchange.

See also

 European Launcher Development Organisation (ELDO)
 European Space Agency (ESA)
 European Space Research Organisation (ESRO)

References

European Space Agency
Enlargement of intergovernmental organizations